The Carrizal River is a river of Ecuador.

See also
List of rivers of Ecuador

References
 Rand McNally, The New International Atlas, 1993.
  GEOnet Names Server 
 Water Resources Assessment of Ecuador

Rivers of Ecuador